Wilson Hollow Brook is a river in Delaware County, New York. It flows into Downs Brook in Downsville, New York.

References

Rivers of New York (state)
Rivers of Delaware County, New York
Tributaries of the East Branch Delaware River